South Korea national field hockey team may refer to:
 South Korea men's national field hockey team
 South Korea women's national field hockey team